Vi Er Cir.Cuz (We Are Cir.Cuz) is the second album from Norwegian pop duo Cir.Cuz (Mats Melbye and Thomas Pedersen).  Work started on the album in 2012 and was released on 8 November 2013. The release of the album was preceded by the release of three singles from the album: "Gatelys"  (released on 28 May 2012), "Supernova" (released on 30 November 2012),  and "Tidløs" (released on 29 April 2013). "Supernova" peaked at number 5 on the Norwegian Singles Chart.

Track listing 
 Terningkast (featuring Byz) (4:39)
 Tidløs (3:16)
 Vi Er (3:48)
 Over Meg (3:20)
 Supernova (featuring Julie Bergan) (3:54)
 Komplisert (3:20)
 Usynlig (featuring Iselin Solheim) (3:23)
 Gatelys (3:33)
 Tornerose (3:49)
 Skål (3:43)

References

External links 

Cir.Cuz albums
2013 albums